Thomas Enqvist was the defending champion but lost in the second round to Tomás Carbonell.

Jim Courier won in the final 6–4, 6–3 against Chris Woodruff.

Seeds

  Thomas Enqvist (second round)
  Jim Courier (champion)
  Wayne Ferreira (first round)
  Marcelo Ríos (quarterfinals)
  Mark Philippoussis (first round)
  Mark Woodforde (semifinals)
  Todd Woodbridge (semifinals)
  Byron Black (quarterfinals)

Draw

Finals

Top half

Bottom half

References
 1996 Comcast U.S. Indoor Draw

U.S. Pro Indoor
1996 ATP Tour